The following is a list of rail transit stations in the Greater Manila Area, which incorporates the Manila Light Rail Transit System, the Manila Metro Rail Transit System and the Philippine National Railways Metro Commuter Line. The list includes existing and future LRT, MRT and Metro Commuter stations in the metropolitan region. Line names are named according to the new names provided by the Department of Transportation (2012).

Line names
The Strong Republic Transit System program unified the separate rail systems of Metro Manila for the first time in 2003 with the adoption of color-coded names and integrated fare system for Lines 1–3 and PNR.  The current color naming system was adopted in 2012.

Current stations

Future stations

List of PNR stations

See also
 Manila Light Rail Transit System
 Manila Metro Rail Transit System
 Philippine National Railways
 Strong Republic Transit System
 Transportation in Metro Manila

References
 Lines 1 and 2 route map
 Line 3 route map
 2003 SONA Technical Report

 01
Manila
 
 
Rail transit stations
Rail transit stations
Rail transit stations